The Lacey Township School District is a comprehensive community public school district serving students in kindergarten through twelfth grade from Lacey Township, in Ocean County, New Jersey, along the state's Jersey Shore and South Jersey regions.

As of the 2018–19 school year, the district, comprising six schools, had an enrollment of 4,026 students and 332.2 classroom teachers (on an FTE basis), for a student–teacher ratio of 12.1:1.

The district is classified by the New Jersey Department of Education as being in District Factor Group "DE", the fifth-highest of eight groupings. District Factor Groups organize districts statewide to allow comparison by common socioeconomic characteristics of the local districts. From lowest socioeconomic status to highest, the categories are A, B, CD, DE, FG, GH, I and J.

The school district includes six schools. Cedar Creek School (CCS), Lanoka Harbor School (LHS) and Forked River School (FRS) serve grades K-4.  Mill Pond serves grades 5-6. Lacey Township Middle School (LTMS) is an intermediate school for grades 7-8 and is located behind the high school. Lacey Township High School (LTHS) has served grades 9-12 since its creation in 1981.

Schools
Schools in the district (with 2018–19 enrollment data from the National Center for Education Statistics) are:

Elementary schools
Cedar Creek Elementary School with 499 students in grades K-4
Jacqueline Ranuska, Principal
Forked River Elementary School with 391 students in grades K-4
Eric P. Fiedler, Principal
Lanoka Harbor Elementary School with 466 students in grades K-4
Jeffrey Brewer, Principal
Mill Pond Elementary School with 766 students in grades 5-6
Holly Neimiec, Principal
Middle school
Lacey Township Middle School with 679 students in grades 7-8
Jason King, Principal
Ed Subokow, Assistant Principal
High school
Lacey Township High School with 1,201 students in grades 9-12. Its symbol is a lion's paw, for the "Lacey Lions."
Greg Brandis, Principal
Mark Angelo, Assistant Principal
Timothy Dowd, Assistant Principal

Administration
Core members of the district's administration are:
Dr. Vanessa Clark, Superintendent
Patrick S. DeGeorge, Business Administrator / Board Secretary

Board of education
The district's board of education, with nine members, sets policy and oversees the fiscal and educational operation of the district through its administration. As a Type II school district, the board's trustees are elected directly by voters to serve three-year terms of office on a staggered basis, with three seats up for election each year held (since 2012) as part of the November general election. The board appoints a superintendent to oversee the day-to-day operation of the district.

References

External links
Lacey Township School District
 
School Data for the Lacey Township School District, National Center for Education Statistics

Lacey Township, New Jersey
New Jersey District Factor Group DE
School districts in Ocean County, New Jersey